Leith is a city in Grant County, North Dakota, United States. The population was 28 at the 2020 census.

History
Leith was founded in 1910 along a Milwaukee Road branch line that separated from the railroad's Pacific Extension in McLaughlin, South Dakota, and ran to New England, North Dakota. The name was given by railroad officials and comes from the harbor town of Leith near Edinburgh, Scotland. This line was abandoned in 1984, isolating Leith, as none of the primary highways in the area were constructed to go through the city.

White nationalists
 

In 2012, after moving to Leith, Craig Cobb began buying up land, at one point, reportedly owning at least 12 plots of land.  Cobb has expressed a desire to turn the town into a white nationalist community.  As a reaction to Cobb, some locals have advocated to disincorporate Leith back into Grant County proper. In November 2013 Cobb was arrested and charged with three counts of terrorizing stemming from an incident in which he confronted another town resident with both a shotgun and a rifle.

Today, Cobb no longer owns any buildings in Leith. He deeded six properties back to the town at no charge and sold off a few others. Three are still owned by other white supremacists, but they have shown little inclination to take up where Cobb left off.

After two men suspected of ties to Cobb were elected to the city council in June 2018, mayor Ryan Schock circulated a petition to disincorporate Leith. The Grant County commission subsequently cleared the way for a referendum on July 23, 2018 on dissolving the city. However, due to concerns that the original date was earlier than Century Code (state statutes) permitted, the vote was moved to November 6, the day of the 2018 midterm elections. As of September 2022, the city of Leith is still listed on the website of Grant County.

Geography
Leith is located at  (46.358871, -101.636202).

Demographics

2010 census
As of the census of 2010, there were 16 people, 8 households, and 5 families residing in the city. The racial makeup of the city was 93.8% White and 6.3% African American (each person makes up 6.3% of the population).

There were 8 households, of which 12.5% had children under the age of 18 living with them, 50.0% were married couples living together, 12.5% had a female householder with no husband present, and 37.5% were non-families. 37.5% of all households were made up of individuals, and 25% had someone living alone who was 65 years of age or older. The average household size was 2.00 and the average family size was 2.60.

The median age in the city was 55 years. 12.5% of residents were under the age of 18; 0.0% were between the ages of 18 and 24; 25% were from 25 to 44; 31.4% were from 45 to 64; and 31.3% were 65 years of age or older. The gender makeup of the city was 50.0% male and 50.0% female.

2000 census
As of the census of 2000, there were 28 people, 14 households, and 7 families residing in the city. The population density was 22.7 people per square mile (8.8/km). There were 21 housing units at an average density of 17.0 per square mile (6.6/km). The racial makeup of the city was 100.00% White.

There were 14 households, out of which none had children under the age of 18 living with them, 50.0% were married couples living together, 7.1% had a female householder with no husband present, and 42.9% were non-families. 42.9% of all households were made up of individuals, and 21.4% had someone living alone who was 65 years of age or older. The average household size was 2.00 and the average family size was 2.75.

In the city, the population was spread out, with 10.7% under the age of 18, 3.6% from 18 to 24, 35.7% from 25 to 44, 21.4% from 45 to 64, and 28.6% who were 65 years of age or older. The median age was 43 years. For every 100 females, there were 86.7 males. For every 100 females age 18 and over, there were 92.3 males.

The median income for a household in the city was $12,031, and the median income for a family was $21,250. Males had a median income of $16,250 versus $13,750 for females. The per capita income for the city was $8,171. There were 55.6% of families and 51.2% of the population living below the poverty line, including 100.0% of under eighteens and 20.0% of those over 64.

References

External links
 City page on the Grant County, ND website
 List of historical newspaper articles
 Welcome to Leith documentary trailer

Cities in North Dakota
Cities in Grant County, North Dakota
Populated places established in 1910
1910 establishments in North Dakota
White supremacy in the United States